Petre Libardi (27 August 1942 – 14 August 2005) was a Romanian footballer who played as an attacking midfielder.

Club career
Petre Libardi was born on 27 August 1942 in Câmpulung-Muscel and started playing football at Minerul Câmpulung. He went for a short period at Dinamo Pitești, but returned at Minerul Câmpulung and in 1963 he went to play at Jiul Petroșani where on 21 August 1966 he made Divizia A debut in a 7–0 victory against Steagul Roșu Brașov. He was Jiul's captain ten years from 1965 until 1975, a period in which he appeared in 238 Divizia A games in which he scored 38 goals, played two Cupa României finals, winning one and made two appearances in the double against Dundee United in the 1974–75 European Cup Winners' Cup which was lost with 3–2 on aggregate. After he retired he worked as a manager, also he was Jiul Petroșani's president. In 2001 Libardi was awarded the Honorary Citizen of Petroșani title. Petre Libardi died on 14 August 2005 and in 2019, at 100 years since Jiul Petroșani was founded, the authorities decided to change the name of the local stadium from Jiul to Petre Libardi in his honor.

International career
Petre Libardi played two games at international level for Romania, making his debut under coach Bazil Marian in a 1–1 friendly against Uruguay, which took place in Montevideo on Estadio Gran Parque Central. His second game was also a friendly which ended 0–0 against Poland.

Honours
Jiul Petroșani
Divizia B: 1965–66
Cupa României: 1973–74, runner-up 1971–72

Notes

References

External links

Petre Libardi player profile at Labtof.ro
Petre Libardi manager profile at Labtof.ro

1942 births
2005 deaths
Romanian footballers
Romania international footballers
Association football midfielders
Liga I players
Liga II players
FC Argeș Pitești players
CSM Jiul Petroșani players
Romanian football managers
CSM Jiul Petroșani managers
Romanian sports executives and administrators